DZRK (106.3 FM) Radyo Kapitbisig is a radio station owned and operated by the Far East Broadcasting Company. The station's studio is located in Luke Society Palawan, Brgy. Poblacion, Quezon, Palawan.

References

Radio stations in Palawan
Radio stations established in 2014
Christian radio stations in the Philippines
2014 establishments in the Philippines
Far East Broadcasting Company